Lisa Raymond and Samantha Stosur were the defending champions, but lost in first round to Nathalie Dechy and Tatiana Golovin.

Květa Peschke and Francesca Schiavone won the title by defeating Anna-Lena Grönefeld and Liezel Huber 2–6, 6–4, 6–1 in the final.

Seeds

Draw

Draw

References
 Main and Qualifying Rounds

2006 Doubles
Fortis Championships Luxembourg - Doubles
2006 in Luxembourgian tennis